Aleksa Markovic (born 13 April 2001) is an Austrian footballer who plays as a midfielder for SV Stripfing.

Career
In September 2020, Markovic joined Romanian club Sepsi OSK on a one-year contract.

In February 2022, he joined German Regionalliga club SV Stripfing.

References

External links

Aleksa Markovic at OEFB

2001 births
Living people
Austrian footballers
Austrian expatriate  footballers
Liga I players
Sepsi OSK Sfântu Gheorghe players
Association football midfielders
Expatriate footballers in Romania
Floridsdorfer AC players
Regionalliga players
Rot-Weiß Oberhausen players